European Universities Judo Championships were the first organised in 1961. The 2nd edition was planned to be hosted in August 1962 in Huizingen (Belgium). In 1964 the championships were held in Delft (Holland). They were not repeated until 2011 (Sarajevo), 2013 (Coimbra) and 2015 (Paris). They are reinvented as part of European Universities Games.

The European Universities Judo Championships are currently coordinated by the European University Sports Association along with the 18 other sports on the program of the European universities championships.

Summary

Results 2011

Results 2013

Results 2015

References

External links 
 

judo
Judo competitions